Caught: The Lives of Juvenile Justice is a political and history podcast that focuses on mass incarceration in the United States. The show is produced by WNYC Studios and hosted by Kai Wright.

Background 
The show discusses issues concerning mental health. Incarceration disproportionately effects black and brown people in the United States, who are the primary subjects of the podcast.

The first episode discusses the story of a sixteen year old black boy called "Z". In the episode entitle "You Just Sit There And Wait For The Next Day To Come", the continued use of solitary confinement is discussed.

Reception 
The New Yorker included the show on their list of "The Best Podcasts of 2018". The show won a Silver Baton in the 2019 duPont-Columbia Awards. The show was an honoree in the 2019 Webby Awards.

References

External links 

Audio podcasts
2018 podcast debuts
History podcasts
Political podcasts
WNYC Studios programs